Aaadonta constricta komakanensis is a subspecies of land snail, a terrestrial pulmonate gastropod mollusk in the family Endodontidae. It is endemic to Palau, where it was previously known from Koror, but has not been seen since 1936. If it is still extant, it is threatened by destruction or modification of its habitat.

References

Endodontidae
Endemic fauna of Palau
Gastropods described in 1976